Alton railway station is a station in the town of Alton, in the English county of Hampshire. The station is the terminus for two railway lines: the Alton Line which runs to Brookwood and on to London Waterloo, and the Mid Hants Watercress Railway which runs to Alresford. The latter once ran through to Winchester but was closed to passengers in February 1973; it reopened as a heritage line in 1985. Two other routes, both now closed, also served the station – the Meon Valley line to Fareham and the Basingstoke and Alton Light Railway.

Services operate along the Alton Line to Brookwood and join the South West Main Line towards London Waterloo. The line was single-tracked as far as Farnham by British Rail in the early 1980s.

Platforms

There are three platforms in use. South Western Railway use platforms one and two, connected by a footbridge. Platform three is used by the Mid Hants Railway.

History

The first station opened by the London and South Western Railway in 1852 was sited on what is now the station car park. It closed when the present station opened in 1865. The London & South Western Railway became part of the Southern Railway during the Grouping of 1923. The line from Woking to Alton was electrified in 1937 and the station passed on to the Southern Region of British Railways on nationalisation in 1948.

When Sectorisation was introduced in 1986, the station was served by Network SouthEast, until the privatisation of British Rail in 1997.

Location
Alton station is located in the local government district of East Hampshire.

The station is nowhere near Alton Towers Resort, which is located in the rural village of Alton in Staffordshire, about 185 miles away. Many people trying to reach the resort have mistakenly travelled to this station. Local residents, who have encountered many people trying to find Alton Towers, have put up posters at the station containing directions from the station to the resort by train, with a journey time of approximately 4 hours and 46 minutes.
Historically there could have been grounds for confusion: Alton Towers railway station which closed in 1965 was, before 1954, called Alton railway station.

Services

Monday to Saturdays there is a half-hourly service to London Waterloo and an hourly service on Sundays, increasing to half-hourly from approximately 1330.

Services are usually operated by Class 450 Desiro units, although the Class 444 & Class 458 is also sometimes used.

Notes

References 

 Body, G. (1984), PSL Field Guides - Railways of the Southern Region, Patrick Stephens Ltd, Cambridge.

External links

 Station on navigable O.S. map

Railway stations in Hampshire
DfT Category C2 stations
Heritage railway stations in Hampshire
Former London and South Western Railway stations
Railway stations in Great Britain opened in 1852
Railway stations served by South Western Railway
Alton, Hampshire
1852 establishments in England